Senator Van Dyke may refer to:
John Van Dyke (politician) (1807–1878), Minnesota State Senate
Nicholas Van Dyke (politician, born 1738) (1738–1789), Delaware State Senate
Nicholas Van Dyke (politician, born 1769) (1769–1826), U.S. senator from Delaware from 1817 to 1826, and Delaware State Senator

See also
Kendall Van Dyk (born 1980), Montana State Senate
Henry H. Van Dyck (1809–1888), New York State Senate